The 1887 Staten Island Cricket Club football team  was an American football team that represented the Staten Island Cricket and Baseball club during the 1887 football season.  In their first year as a member of the American Football Union, the Islanders compiled a 1–3 record (all in the AFU), and were outscored by their opponents by a total of 52 to 37.

Schedule

References

Staten Island Cricket Club
S.I.C.C football team
Staten Island Cricket Club football seasons